The El Bouni district is an Algerian administrative district in the Annaba province.  Its chief town is located on the eponymous town of El Bouni.

Communes 
The daira is composed of only one commune: El Bouni.

References 

Districts of Annaba Province